The Damas River is a seasonal river in Eritrea. It passes outside the town of Ghinda.

See also
List of rivers of Eritrea

References

Rivers of Eritrea